Brian van den Bergh is an Aruban football manager, currently managing Bonaire.

Managerial career
In September 2019, van den Bergh was appointed manager of Bonaire, following stints coaching in England for Greenwich Borough, as well as coaching for Fundación Real Madrid across Europe.

References

Year of birth missing (living people)
Living people
Association football coaches
Aruban football managers
Real Madrid CF non-playing staff
Bonaire national football team managers